In enzymology, a tryptophan-tRNA ligase is an enzyme that catalyzes the chemical reaction

ATP + L-tryptophan + tRNATrp  AMP + diphosphate + L-tryptophyl-tRNATrp

The 3 substrates of this enzyme are ATP, L-tryptophan, and tRNA(Trp), whereas its 3 products are AMP, diphosphate, and L-tryptophyl-tRNATrp.

This enzyme belongs to the family of ligases, to be specific those forming carbon-oxygen bonds in aminoacyl-tRNA and related compounds.  The systematic name of this enzyme class is L-tryptophan:tRNATrp ligase (AMP-forming). Other names in common use include tryptophanyl-tRNA synthetase, L-tryptophan-tRNATrp ligase (AMP-forming), tryptophanyl-transfer ribonucleate synthetase, tryptophanyl-transfer ribonucleic acid synthetase, tryptophanyl-transfer RNA synthetase, tryptophanyl ribonucleic synthetase, tryptophanyl-transfer ribonucleic synthetase, tryptophanyl-tRNA synthase, tryptophan translase, and TrpRS.  This enzyme participates in tryptophan metabolism and aminoacyl-trna biosynthesis.

Structural studies

References

 
 
 

EC 6.1.1
Enzymes of known structure